Richard Robinson is an American and Bermudian chess player, Chess Olympiad individual gold medal winner (1996).

Biography
Richard Robinson was from New York City but he worked in Bermuda for many years. He is known as a regular member of US chess tournaments. His peak success in chess was in 1996 in Yerevan, where he won the gold medal at second board in the Chess Olympiad individual rankings, ahead of his percentage Grandmaster Alex Yermolinsky.

References

External links

Richard Robinson chess games at 365Chess.com

1956 births
2009 deaths
American chess players
Bermudian chess players
20th-century chess players